The Pennsylvania State Game Lands Number 14 are Pennsylvania State Game Lands in Cameron, and Elk Counties in Pennsylvania in the United States providing hunting, bird watching, and other activities.

Geography
State Game Lands Number 14 is located in Shippen Township in Cameron County, and in Benzette Township in Elk County.

The nearest borough is Emporium  to the northeast, nearest populated places include Beechwood, Benezette, Cameron, Dents Run, Grandview, Hicks Run, Howard Siding, Kaulmont, Lawn View, Lockwood, Medix Run, Prospect Park, Rathbun, Rich Valley, Sterling Run, Swissmont, Truman, Weber City, West Creek, and Wilmer.

U.S. Route 120 passes to the north and east, U.S. Route 155 and Pennsylvania Route 46 connect to U.S. 120 northeast of SGL 14.

SGL 14 is drained by tributaries of the Sinnemahoning Creek, part of the Susquehanna River watershed.

Nearby natural areas include Pennsylvania State Game Lands Number 30 and Pennsylvania State Game Lands Number 61 to the north, Kettle Creek State Park and Sproul State Forest to the east, Bucktail State Park Natural Area to the southeast, Pennsylvania State Game Lands Number 34, Pennsylvania State Game Lands Number 94 and Pennsylvania State Game Lands Number 311 to the south, Pennsylvania State Game Lands Number 94 and Pennsylvania State Game Lands Number 331 to the southwest, Pennsylvania State Game Lands Number 44 to the west, and Elk State Park, Pennsylvania State Game Lands Number 25 and Pennsylvania State Game Lands Number 293 both to the northwest.

Statistics
SGL 14 is located at

Biology
Wildlife species in SGL 14 include bear (Ursus americanus), deer (Odocoileus virginianus), grouse (Bonasa umbellus) and turkey (Meleagris gallopavo).

See also
Pennsylvania State Game Lands
Pennsylvania State Game Lands Number 25, also located in Elk County
Pennsylvania State Game Lands Number 28, also located in Elk County

References

External links
The National Map Advance Viewer
Geographic Names Information System
State Game Lands 014

014
Protected areas of Cameron County, Pennsylvania
Protected areas of Elk County, Pennsylvania